Salegentibacter mishustinae is a Gram-negative, strictly aerobic, heterotrophic and non-motile bacterium from the genus of Salegentibacter which has been isolate from a sea urchin (Strongylocentrotus intermedius) from the Sea of Japan.

References

Flavobacteria
Bacteria described in 2005